Kingsley Armstrong (born 10 December 1962) is a Saint Lucian professional football manager.

Career
In 1996 and since January 2002 until June 2004 he coached the Saint Lucia national football team.

References

External links
Profile at Soccerway.com
Profile at Soccerpunter.com

1962 births
Living people
Saint Lucian football managers
Saint Lucia national football team managers
Place of birth missing (living people)